Dragsholm Castle is a historic building in Zealand, Denmark.

For about 800 years there has been a building on the islet by the “drag”. From the original palace over the medieval castle to the current baroque style, Dragsholm Castle has had an influence on and been influenced by changing times and the surrounding community.
Today, Dragsholm Castle has restaurant and hotel facilities.

The name Dragsholm
Prior to the reclamation of the Lammefjord, Odsherred was connected to the rest of Zealand by a narrow strip of land, known as a ”draugh” or ”drag”, located east of Dragsholm where the mill, Dragsmølle, lies today. The Vikings could drag their ships across the strip of land and then sail through to Roskilde, avoiding the dangerous waters north of Zealand. The islet on which Dragsholm Castle was built is surrounded by lakes and meadows just south of the terminal moraine, which ends at Vejrhøj (123 m) to the north.
Consequently, Dragsholm means the islet by the ”drag”.

History

Early history
Dragsholm Slot is one of the oldest secular buildings in Denmark. The original Dragsholm Castle was built around 1215 by the Bishop of Roskilde. During the Middle Ages, the building was modified from the original palace to a fortified castle. During the Count's Feud (1534–36) (Grevens Fejde) it was so strong that it was the only castle on Zealand to withstand the armies of Count Christoffer.

Crownland and prison, 1536–1664

In connection with the Reformation, Dragsholm was confiscated by the Crown along with all other property of the Catholic church. As Crownland during the period from 1536 to 1664, Dragsholm Castle was used as a prison for noble and ecclesiastical prisoners. In the large tower at the northeast corner of the medieval castle, prison cells were made and equipped with toilets and windows depending on the prisoner's crimes, behaviour and the seriousness of his insults towards the King.

Some of the best known prisoners at Dragsholm Castle include: the last Catholic Bishop in Roskilde and former owner of the castle, Joachim Rønnow; James Hepburn, 4th Earl of Bothwell, third husband of Mary, Queen of Scots; and the seemingly raving mad squire, Ejler Brockenhuus.

Baroque castle
During the wars against Charles X Gustav of Sweden, an attempt was made to blow up Dragsholm Castle, and the place was a ruin until the King, as part payment of his outstanding debts, gave the castle to the grocer Heinrich Müller, and he started the restoration.

In 1694, Dragsholm Castle was sold to the nobleman Frederik Christian Adeler (1668-1726) and finally rebuilt as the baroque castle we see today. Several owners from that family have made a lasting imprint on the development, including G. F. O. Zytphen Adeler, who took the initiative to drain the Lammefjord. The Adeler Family lost its wealth in 1932 as the Danmarks bank collapsed and Dragsholm Castle passed over to the Central Land Board which sold the place to J.F. Bøttger, but only with the land belonging to the main estate.

Architecture

Today, the baroque style of the castle remains intact, but the interior of the Castle has been subject to restorations and modernisations over the years. The most recent major restoration took place after the first world war, where the Baron aimed for a Late Romantic Style, which still prevails in the salons and ballrooms.

Hauntings
Witnesses and psychics have claimed that there are three ghosts who are residents at the castle: a grey lady, a white lady and Lord Bothwell. The Earl is said to ride through the courtyard with a full horse and carriage.

Dragsholm Castle today
In recent years, the Bøttger family has managed the running of the castle after a number of minor restorations, which in addition to general conservation of the building has had the purpose of raising the level of quality of the castle as a hotel, restaurant and attraction. The hotel rooms at the castle have been refurbished and modernised, and more rooms have been added in the porter's lodge on the other side of the moat.

List of owners
 ( -1536) Roskilde Bispestol 
 (1536-1664) Kronen 
 (1664-1682) Henrik Müller 
 (1688-1694) Manuel de Texeira 
 (1694-1726) Frederik Christian von Adeler 
 (1726-1727) Boet efter Frederik Christian von Adeler 
 (1727-1757) Christian von Lente Adeler 
 (1757-1785) Conrad Wilhelm Adeler 
 (1785-1816) Frederik Adeler 
 (1816-1839) Bertha Moltke, gift Adeler 
 (1839-1878) Georg Frederik Otto Zypten-Adeler 
 (1878-1908) Frederik Herman Christian de Falsen Zypthen-Adeler 
 (1908-1932) Georg Frederik de Falsen Zypthen-Adeler 
 (1932-1936) Slægten von Zytphen-Adeler 
 (1936) Statens Jordlovsudvalg 
 (1936-1985) Johan Frederik Bøttger 
 (1985-2002) Flemming Frederik Bøttger 
 (2002- ) Inge Merete og Peter Bøttger

See also
List of ghosts
 Bøstrup (manor house)

References

Sources and external links
 Dragsholm Castle official website
 History of Dragsholm Castle official website
 Ellingelyng.dk (Odsherred history website): Dragsholm Castle: history and images 
 Dragsholm Castle in Guide to Denmark

Buildings and structures completed in 1215
Castles in Denmark
Defunct prisons in Denmark
Hotels in Denmark
Castles in Region Zealand
Listed buildings and structures in Odsherred Municipality
Listed castles and manor houses in Denmark
Reportedly haunted locations
Buildings and structures associated with the Adeler family